James Klutse Avedzi is a Ghanaian politician and member of the Seventh Parliament of the Fourth Republic of Ghana representing the Ketu North Constituency in the Volta Region on the ticket of the National Democratic Congress.

Early life 
James Klutse Avedzi was born on 14 July 1964. He hails from Xipe in the Volta Region of Ghana. He attended University of Liverpool and graduated with a master's degree in Finance and Accounting in 2016. He further pursued a doctorate in International and Political Finance in Business at the university of Costa Rica. He also had his ICA-G from the Institute of Chartered Accountant in Ghana and also his MCIT from Ghana Chartered Institute of Taxation. He also had his Fcfia from the Chartered Institute of Financial and Investment Analysis in Ghana.

Personal life 
James is married with four children. He is a Christian who worships in the Global Evangelical Church His wife died on 30 January 2020 after being unwell for some time at the Ketu South District Hospital.

Career 
James Klutse Avedzi worked as the principal accountant at the Controller and Accountant Generals Department in Accra from 1995 before seeking political office in 2004. He was the former Chairman of the Finance Committee in parliament of Ghana. He was also the Chairman of the Public Accounts Committee of parliament. He was also the Deputy Minority Leader for the NDC in parliament.

Political career 
James is a member of the National Democratic congress (NDC), He contest and won the parliamentary seat for the Ketu North constituency in 2005. He has since then represented the Ketu North Constituency in the 5th, 6th and 7th Parliament of the 4th Republic of Ghana.

Achievements 
He constructed roads and gave scholarships to students in his constituency. He built schools and provided water to communities who had water problems. As the member of parliament, he connected about 150 villages to the national grid.

References 

Ghanaian MPs 2017–2021
1964 births
Living people
Ghanaian MPs 2013–2017
Alumni of the University of Liverpool
University of Costa Rica alumni
People from Volta Region
National Democratic Congress (Ghana) politicians
Ghanaian Christians
Government ministers of Ghana
Ghanaian accountants
Ghanaian MPs 2021–2025